Poland women's national goalball team is the women's national team of Poland.  Goalball is a team sport designed specifically for athletes with a vision impairment.  The team takes part in international competitions.

Regional championships 

The team competes in the IBSA Europe goalball region.  

The 1985 European Championships were held in Olsztyn, Poland with six teams competing.  The team finished fifth. Six teams took part in the 2010 IBSA European Championships Goalball Women B tournament held in Eskişehir, Turkey in July.  The team finished sixth.

Competitive history 
The table below contains individual game results for the team in international matches and competitions.

See also 

 Disabled sports 
 Poland at the Paralympics

References

Goalball women's
National women's goalball teams
Poland at the Paralympics
European national goalball teams